Samuel Fields was a figure of the American Wild West and an active participant in the African-American community of Deadwood, South Dakota.

Fields moved to Deadwood around 1876 to seek his fortune. He claimed to have been a General in the Union Army during the American Civil War; however, this was false.

Career
Fields went by several nicknames—including "Hoe General" and "General Darkey"—but was commonly known as "General Fields". The man easily deflected any racial epithets and regardless of his personal wealth at any moment, referred to himself as a "sly-coon".

In Deadwood, African Americans were even more of a minority than the Chinese, and Fields was quick to speak out at the many "Colored Citizens Meetings," as well as city political gatherings. An eloquent speaker, he soon earned yet another nickname – the "Shakespearian Darkey."
 
So "entertaining" was Fields, that the local papers often took his words out of context to provide even better stories for their readers. Such was the case when Fields correctly identified a tornado that touched down in Deadwood Gulch as a cyclone in June, 1881. Reporting on his statement, the Deadwood Times snidely referred to it as a "Sly-Coon," which added that nickname to Samuel's already growing list of monikers. While sometimes the newspapers reported legitimate news about Fields, it was often such trivial events such as "The Shakespearian Darkey attacked by snow balls" and "Wonder what bar the darkey cleaned up this morning?"
 
The quick talking man seemed to be everywhere in Deadwood and in April, 1878 he was arrested as a murder accomplice when Bill Gay shot and killed a man named Lloyd Forbes who was having an affair with his wife. According to the tale, Fields had carried a note between the lovers, when Bill Gay intercepted it. Gay, who was a leading citizen in Deadwood and after whom the adjacent camp of Gayville was named, defended himself on the basis that the killing was an accident. Gay argued that he only meant to pistol whip Forbes and the gun had gone off by accident.
 
Fields was arrested on the same day as Gay and was kept in the jail for several weeks, mostly for his own protection. Though Fields soon went free, Bill Gay was found guilty of second degree murder and sent to prison. Though Fields had been vindicated, there were many of those in camp who believed that he should be made to leave.
 
In July, the "General" was arrested for stealing from "Lola's Place", and his bad luck continued when Deadwood's first public school teacher was murdered in her sleep in August. It seems that Fields was either constantly in the wrong place at the wrong time, or had become the focus of blame for any evil that was taking place in the camp.
 
Almost immediately after Minnie Callison had been found murdered, rumors began to circulate that the "General" had been seen outside her room that same night. To further complicate matters, Officer Siver found footprints in her yard that were the same size as Fields. Minnie's husband, John Callison, was convinced that Fields was her murderer. On August 20, 1878, Samuel was arrested, and though he was later released, it was yet another cloud that continued to hang over his head.

Then, in December, 1878, the papers reported that Fields had prevented a woman named Annie Simms from committing suicide, so it seems it wasn't all mischief that the papers were reporting on.
 
In 1879, Fields' name was submitted for the position of Justice in Deadwood and by November he was once again practicing his "Shakespearian" oratory skills on soap boxes. But the camp hadn't forgotten his alleged "criminal" past and he was egged by the audience. Though he didn't win the election, it didn't curb his political ambitions. In 1883, he was working to fill the vacant position of coroner and did in fact temporarily fill the position.
 
During Fields' time in Deadwood, he was known to have worked at the Merchants, Wentworth, and International Hotels as a porter and as a waiter. By 1889, he had moved on to Omaha, Nebraska, but a year later, he was again back in South Dakota, working as a bellhop in Rapid City. Afterwards, his whereabouts are lost to history.

Samuel Fields's exploits were common fodder in local newspapers, such as the Black Hills Pioneer.

In popular culture
Fields was portrayed by Franklyn Ajaye in the HBO series Deadwood and in 2019's Deadwood: The Movie.

References

External links
Newspaper accounts of General Fields

Year of birth missing
Year of death missing
African Americans in the American Civil War
African Americans in the American Old West
People from Deadwood, South Dakota
Place of birth missing